Helga Seidler ( Fischer, born 5 August 1949 in Oberneuschönberg) is a former East German athlete who mainly competed in the women's 400 metres event.

She competed for East Germany at the 1972 Summer Olympics held in Munich, Germany where she won the gold medal in the women's 4 × 400 meters with her team mates Dagmar Käsling, Rita Kühne and Monika Zehrt.

References

1949 births
Living people
East German female sprinters
Athletes (track and field) at the 1972 Summer Olympics
Olympic athletes of East Germany
Olympic gold medalists for East Germany
Recipients of the Patriotic Order of Merit
European Athletics Championships medalists
Medalists at the 1972 Summer Olympics
Olympic gold medalists in athletics (track and field)
Olympic female sprinters